The WTA Tour is the elite tour for women's professional tennis organized by the Women's Tennis Association (WTA). The 2011 WTA Tour includes the Grand Slam tournaments (sanctioned by the International Tennis Federation (ITF)), the WTA Premier tournaments, the WTA International tournaments, the Fed Cup (organized by the ITF), the Commonwealth Bank Tournament of Champions and the WTA Championships.

Schedule
This is the complete schedule of events on the 2011 WTA Tour. Player progression will be documented from the quarterfinals stage.

Key

January

February

March

April

May

June

July

August

September

October

Statistical information
These tables present the number of singles (S), doubles (D), and mixed doubles (X) titles won by each player and each nation during the season, within all the tournament categories of the 2011 WTA Tour: the Grand Slam tournaments, the year-end championships (the WTA Tour Championships and the Tournament of Champions), the WTA Premier tournaments (Premier Mandatory, Premier 5, and regular Premier), and the WTA International tournaments.

 total number of titles (a doubles title won by two players representing the same nation counts as only one win for the nation);
 highest amount of highest category tournaments (for example, having a single Grand Slam gives preference over any kind of combination without a Grand Slam title); 
 a singles > doubles > mixed doubles hierarchy; 
 alphabetical order (by family names for players).

Key

Titles won by player

Titles won by nation

Titles information
The following players won their first title in singles (S), doubles (D) or mixed doubles (X):
 Iveta Benešová – Wimbledon (X)
 Alberta Brianti – Fes (S)
 Dominika Cibulková – Moscow (S)
 Casey Dellacqua – French Open (X)
 Vitalia Diatchenko – Tashkent (D)
 Natalie Grandin – Seoul (D)
 Polona Hercog – Båstad (S)
 Sabine Lisicki – Stuttgart (D)
 Melanie Oudin – US Open (X)
 Ksenia Pervak – Tashkent (S)
 Chanelle Scheepers – Guangzhou (S)
 Galina Voskoboeva – Kuala Lumpur (D)
 Barbora Záhlavová-Strýcová – Quebec City (S)
 Zhang Shuai – Osaka (D)
 Zheng Saisai – Guangzhou (D)

The following players completed a successful title defence in singles (S), doubles (D) or mixed doubles (X):

 Iveta Benešová – Monterrey (D)
 Edina Gallovits-Hall – Bogotá (D)
 Lucie Hradecká – Bad Gastein (D)
 Ana Ivanovic – Bali (S)
 María José Martínez Sánchez – Dubai (D)
 Anastasia Pavlyuchenkova – Monterrey (S)
 Květa Peschke – Doha (D)
 Caroline Wozniacki – Copenhagen (S), New Haven (S)
 Barbora Záhlavová-Strýcová – Monterrey (D)

Titles information
The following players won their first title in singles (S), doubles (D) or mixed doubles (X):
 Iveta Benešová – Wimbledon (X)
 Alberta Brianti – Fes (S)
 Dominika Cibulková – Moscow (S)
 Casey Dellacqua – French Open (X)
 Vitalia Diatchenko – Tashkent (D)
 Natalie Grandin – Seoul (D)
 Polona Hercog – Båstad (S)
 Sabine Lisicki – Stuttgart (D)
 Melanie Oudin – US Open (X)
 Ksenia Pervak – Tashkent (S)
 Chanelle Scheepers – Guangzhou (S)
 Galina Voskoboeva – Kuala Lumpur (D)
 Barbora Záhlavová-Strýcová – Quebec City (S)
 Zhang Shuai – Osaka (D)
 Zheng Saisai – Guangzhou (D)

The following players completed a successful title defence in singles (S), doubles (D) or mixed doubles (X):

 Iveta Benešová – Monterrey (D)
 Edina Gallovits-Hall – Bogotá (D)
 Lucie Hradecká – Bad Gastein (D)
 Ana Ivanovic – Bali (S)
 María José Martínez Sánchez – Dubai (D)
 Anastasia Pavlyuchenkova – Monterrey (S)
 Květa Peschke – Doha (D)
 Caroline Wozniacki – Copenhagen (S), New Haven (S)
 Barbora Záhlavová-Strýcová – Monterrey (D)

Rankings
The Race to the Championships determines the players in the WTA Tour Championships in October. The WTA rankings are based on tournaments of the latest 52 weeks.

Singles
The following is the 2011 top 20 in the Race to the Championships and the top 20 ranked players in the world. Premier Mandatory Events are counted for players in the top 10, even if they did not compete, unless there is an injury excuse. Gold backgrounds indicate players that qualified for the WTA Tour Championships. Blue backgrounds indicate players that became alternates at the WTA Tour Championships.

Number 1 ranking

Doubles
The following is the 2011 top 20 in the Race to the Championships – Doubles and the top 20 individual ranked doubles players. Gold backgrounds indicate teams that have qualified for WTA Tour Championships.

Number 1 ranking

WTA Prize Money Leaders
The top-16 players earned over $1,000,000.

Statistics leaders
Service and return statistical leaders at the conclusion of the year, according to the WTA.

Points distribution

Retirements
Following are notable players who have announced they will retire from the WTA Tour during the 2011 season:
  Maret Ani (born 31 January 1982 in Tallinn), turned professional in 1997 with a high singles ranking career of No. 63 15 May 2006 and a high doubles ranking career of No. 39 5 April 2004.
 Sybille Bammer (born 27 April 1980 in Linz), a former world no. 19, and US Open quarter-finalist. Bammer announced her retirement after defeat to Monica Niculescu in the first round of Wimbledon, but briefly returned two weeks later to play her home-country tournament at 2011 Gastein Ladies, where she lost in the second round to Yvonne Meusburger 6–2, 6–1.
 Alona Bondarenko (born 13 August 1984 in Kryvyi Rih) She won the Australian Open Women's Doubles Yitle, partnering with her younger sister Kateryna. They defeated the pairing Shahar Pe'er and Victoria Azarenka. Bondarenko played her last match in 2011.
  Stéphanie Cohen-Aloro (born 18 March 1983, in Paris) has reached a career high of 61 in singles and 54 in doubles. She played her final match at the 2011 Open GDF Suez where she was a lucky loser, losing to Bethanie Mattek-Sands 7–5, 6–3.
  Surina De Beer (born 28 June 1978 in Pretoria) De Beer has won 10 singles and 36 doubles titles on the ITF tour in her career. On 6 July 1998, she reached her best singles ranking of world number 116. On 25 September 2000, she peaked at world number 49 in the doubles rankings. 
  Yuliana Fedak (born 8 June 1983 in Nova Kakhovka), turned professional in 1998 with a high singles ranking career of No 63 18 September 2006 and a high doubles ranking career of No. 34 15 January 2007.
  Tathiana Garbin (born 30 June 1977 in Mestre) The winner of one singles and eleven doubles WTA Tour titles,[3] she reached her highest singles ranking World No. 22 on 21 May 2007, and her highest doubles ranking World No. 25 on 27 August 2001.
  Justine Henin (born 1 June 1982 in Liège), a former world No. 1 in singles and holder of 43 WTA titles including: 7 Grand Slams 2 Year End Championships and the Olympic gold medal in the 2004 games, as well as two doubles titles. Henin first retired in 2008 as the world No. 1, but later came out of retirement in 2010. On her return to tour she won two WTA titles; the 2010 Porsche Tennis Grand Prix and the 2010 UNICEF Open. She also reached the final of the 2010 Brisbane International and the final of the 2010 Australian Open. She played her final match against Svetlana Kuznetsova in the third round of the 2011 Australian Open, losing 4–6, 6–7(8). She retired for the second time due to the recurrence of an elbow injury received in the 2010 Wimbledon Championships. The injury had initially caused her to end her 2010 season prematurely.
 Alicia Molik (born 27 January 1981 in Adelaide), turned professional in 1996 with a high singles ranking career of No. 8 on 28 February 2005 and a high doubles ranking career of No. 6 on 6 June 2005. She reached one Grand Slam quarterfinal at the 2005 Australian Open and won two Doubles Slams at the 2005 Australian Open Doubles and 2007 French Open Doubles. Molik also won the bronze medal in the 2004 Summer Olympics defeating Anastasia Myskina. She played her final match at the 2011 Australian Open where she was a wild card, losing to Nadia Petrova in the second round, decided to retire her tennis career.
  Trudi Musgrave (born 10 September 1977 in Newcastle), turned professional in 1994 with a high singles ranking career of No 207 on 20 December 2006 and a high doubles ranking career of No. 62 26 May 2003.
  Martina Müller (born 11 October 1982 in Hanover), turned professional in 1999 with a high singles ranking career of No 33 2 April 2007 and a high doubles ranking career of No. 47 25 February 2008.
  Lilia Osterloh (born 7 April 1978 in Columbus), turned professional in 1997 with a high singles ranking career of No 41 23 April 2001 and a high doubles ranking career of No. 77 23 August 1999.
  Mara Santangelo (born 28 June 1981 in Latina, Lazio), who turned professional in 2003 and has reached a career high ranking of No. 27 on 9 July 2007. In doubles she reached a career-high ranking of No. 5 on 10 September 2007. She has won 2007 French Open in doubles title. 
 Patty Schnyder (born 14 December 1978 in Basel), a former world no. 7, six time Grand Slam quarter finalist, semi finalist at the 2004 Australian Open and three time participant at the Year End Championships. Schnyder retired aged 32 at the 2011 French Open, after a 6–1, 6–3 first round defeat by Sorana Cîrstea.
  Julia Schruff (born 16 August 1982 in Augsburg), turned professional in 1992 with a high singles ranking career of No 52 17 April 2006 and a high doubles ranking career of No. 99 2 October 2006.
  Selima Sfar (born 8 July 1977 in Sidi Bou Said), turned professional in 1999 with a high singles ranking career of No 75 16 July 2001 and a high doubles ranking career of No. 47 28 July 2008.
  Rennae Stubbs (born 26 March 1971 in Sydney) was a former world no. 1 in doubles and has won 60 doubles titles, 4 of which are Slams at the 2000 Australian Open, 2001 and 2004 Wimbledon, and the 2001 US Open. She also won 2 Mixed Doubles Slams at the 2000 Australian Open and 2001 US Open. She played her final match at the 2011 Fed Cup tie against Italy partnering Anastasia Rodionova but end up losing in three sets.
  Karolina Šprem (born 25 October 1984 Varaždin), turned professional in 2001 with a high singles ranking career of No 17 11 October 2004. Šprem's career highlight came at Wimbledon 2004, where she was a quarterfinalist.
  Katie O'Brien (born 2 May 1986 Beverley), turned professional in 1999 with a high singles ranking career of No 84 1 February 2010. On 12 August 2011 she announced her retirement at the age 25.
  Shikha Uberoi (born 5 April 1983, in Bombay), turned professional in 2003 with a high singles ranking career of No 122 29 August 2005 and. 2011 she announced retired from tennis.
  Julia Vakulenko (born 10 July 1983 in Yalta), turned professional in 1998 with a high singles ranking career of No 32 19 November 2007 and high doubles ranking career of No. 87 19 February 2007.

Comebacks
Following are notable players that came back after retirements during the 2011 WTA Tour season:
  Janette Husárová (born 4 June 1974 in Bratislava), who turned professional in 1991 and has reached a career high ranking of No. 31 on 13 January 2003 in singles and in doubles; she was a former world no. 3. She has won 23 WTA Tour doubles including 1 WTA Championships. She returned from her 2010 retirement, partnering Simona Halep at the BLG Luxembourg Open.

Awards
The winners of the 2011 WTA Awards were announced on 14 November 2011.

Player of the Year –  Petra Kvitová
Doubles Team of the Year –  Květa Peschke &  Katarina Srebotnik
Most Improved Player –  Petra Kvitová
Comeback Player of the Year –  Sabine Lisicki
Newcomer of the Year –  Irina-Camelia Begu
Karen Krantzcke Sportsmanship Award –  Petra Kvitová
Player Service Award –  Francesca Schiavone
Fan Favorite Singles Player –  Agnieszka Radwańska
Fan Favorite Doubles Team –  Victoria Azarenka &  Maria Kirilenko
Fan Favorite Breakthrough Player –  Petra Kvitová
Favorite Premier Tournament –  Porsche Tennis Grand Prix (Stuttgart)
Favorite International Tournament –  Abierto Mexicano Telcel (Acapulco)

See also
2011 ATP World Tour
2011 ATP Challenger Tour
2011 ITF Men's Circuit
2011 ITF Women's Circuit
Women's Tennis Association
International Tennis Federation

References

External links
Women's Tennis Association (WTA) official website
International Tennis Federation (ITF) official website

 
WTA Tour
WTA Tour seasons